Mario Jurić (born 7 August 1976) is a Bosnian-Herzegovinian former football player.

Club career
He last played for NK Istra 1961 and retired in 2011 after leaving the club. He played as an offensive midfielder.

International career
He was also called up for the Bosnia and Herzegovina national football team by the head coach Blaž Slišković and Miroslav Blažević in 2008 and made his debut for them in an August 2008 friendly match  against Bulgaria. He came on as a second half substitute for team captain Emir Spahić, but was himself substituted 25 minutes later. It remained his sole international appearance.

Honours
Individual
Best player (FC Shinnik Yaroslavl): 2004, 2005.
 Won 1.HNL with NK Dinamo Zagreb in 2000. and 2003.
 Won Croatian Cup with NK Dinamo Zagreb in 2001. and 2002.
 Won Croatian Supercup with NK Dinamo Zagreb in 2002. and 2003.

References

External links
 NK Slaven Belupo Player Profile – Mario Jurić
 
 Sportnet – Player Profile – Mario Jurić

1976 births
Living people
People from Gradačac
Croats of Bosnia and Herzegovina
Association football midfielders
Bosnia and Herzegovina footballers
Bosnia and Herzegovina international footballers
NK Inter Zaprešić players
HNK Šibenik players
GNK Dinamo Zagreb players
FC Shinnik Yaroslavl players
PFC Spartak Nalchik players
NK Slaven Belupo players
NK Istra 1961 players
First Football League (Croatia) players
Croatian Football League players
Second Football League (Croatia) players
Russian Premier League players
Bosnia and Herzegovina expatriate footballers
Expatriate footballers in Russia
Bosnia and Herzegovina expatriate sportspeople in Russia
Expatriate footballers in Croatia
Bosnia and Herzegovina expatriate sportspeople in Croatia